The 2019 League1 Ontario season was the fifth season of play for the Women's Division of League1 Ontario, a Division 3 semi-professional soccer league in the Canadian soccer pyramid and the highest level of soccer based in the Canadian province of Ontario. FC London won the league championship after beating the Oakville Blue Devils in the finals.

Changes from 2018 
The women's division grew from 13 to 14 teams, with the addition of three new women's sides from FC Oshawa, Alliance United FC, and Ottawa South United, while West Ottawa SC and Toronto Azzurri Blizzard departed the league.

For the first time ever, the L1O season did not include a cup competition which had previously been played alongside the regular season. Additionally, the group stage playoff format was changed to a more traditional knockout bracket with two-leg matchups in the quarter-finals and semi-finals.

Regular season 
Each team plays 13 matches as part of the season; one match against all other teams.  The top eight teams advance to the playoffs to determine the league champion.

Playoffs 
The top eight teams from the regular season qualified for the playoffs. New in 2019, the quarter-finals and semi-finals feature a two-leg format.

Bracket

Statistics

Top goalscorers 

Source:

Top goalkeepers 

 Minimum 360 minutes played.  Source:

Honours
The following awards and nominations were awarded for the 2019 season.

Awards

League All-Stars 
The following players were named League1 Ontario All-Stars for the 2019 season:

First Team All-Star

Second Team All-Star

Third Team All-Star

References

External links 

League1 W
League1 Ontario (women) seasons